Misfire may refer to:
 Misfire (Transformers), the Transformers character
 Misfire (film), a 2014 American action film
 Misfire (That '70s Show), an episode from That '70s Show
 An engine misfire, see engine knocking
 A song on Queen's album Sheer Heart Attack
 A malfunctioned cartridge that fails to discharge at all (dud), doesn't discharge promptly (hang fire), or only partially discharges (squib load) when being shot from a firearm.
 A muzzleloader that does not fire when the trigger is squeezed.

See also 
 Firearm malfunction